Edward Earl Terry (August 22, 1902 – May 18, 1985), known professionally as Tex Terry, was an American film actor who often played a henchman in B-movie Westerns during the 1940s and 1950s.

Biography
Terry was born in Coxville, Indiana. In 1964, he married Isabel Draesemer, a Hollywood agent.
Terry made his last movie in 1972. In 1979, he and his wife moved back to Indiana, where he opened Tex's Longhorn Tavern.  Every August he invited the public to celebrate his birthday by listening to him tell Hollywood stories and watching his movies.

He died in Terre Haute, Indiana on May 18, 1985, and is buried at Coxville Cemetery in Coxville, Indiana.

Filmography

Television credits

External links

Tex Terry Official website
B-Westerns.com The Henchies -Tex Terry
Parke County, Indiana website, Tex Terry – "the bad man of the movies", Parke County, Indiana

American male television actors
Male actors from Indiana
Parke County, Indiana
Male Western (genre) film actors
American male film actors
1902 births
1985 deaths
20th-century American male actors